Claude Mandy (22 July 1908 – 20 August 1978) was a South African cricketer. He played in four first-class matches for Border in 1931/32.

See also
 List of Border representative cricketers

References

External links
 

1908 births
1978 deaths
South African cricketers
Border cricketers